Horsefly or horse-fly is a family of true flies in the insect order Diptera.

Horsefly may also refer to:
Horsefly Lake Provincial Park
Horsefly, British Columbia
Horsefly River

See also
Horsefly weed
The Horse Flies - Ithaca, New York, alternative rock/folk band